Mundanat Leelavathy (born 16 September 1927) is a Malayalam writer, literary  critic, and educationist. She taught at various colleges in Kerala before retiring as Principal from Government Brennen College, Thalassery. During her long literary career, she won several awards including Kendra Sahithya Academy Award, and Kerala Sahithya Academy Award. She is a contemporary of such noted critics in Malayalam including K. M. George, S. Guptan Nair, N. Krishna Pillai, P. K. Balakrishnan, M.K. Sanu, and Sukumar Azhikode. Leelavathy is a recipient of the Padma Shri Award.

Education and career
Leelavathy was born in Kottapadi near Guruvayur in Thrissur district (Then in Malabar district of Madras state) on 16 September 1927. She attended school in Kunnamkulam, another nearby town (Kottapadi is midway between Guruvayur and Kunnamkulam), before joining Maharaja's College, Ernakulam for her B.A. degree. She received her M.A. degree from Madras University. Leelavathy began her teaching career in 1949 as a lecturer at St. Mary's College, Thrissur. After a brief stint at Stella Maris College, Chennai, she joined Victoria College, Palakkad in 1952 and subsequently taught at Maharaja's College and Government Brennen College, Thalassery. She was awarded her Ph.D. degree from Kerala University in 1972. For a brief period of time, she also served as a Visiting Professor in University of Calicut. Leelavathy retired from Brennen College in 1983. She now lives in Thrikkakkara in Ernakulam district.

Awards and honors
During her long literary career, she won several awards and honors including Odakuzhal Award (1978) and Kerala Sahitya Akademi Award (1980) for Varnaraji, Kendra Sahithya Academy Award (1986) for Kavithadhwani, Lalithambika Antarjanam Award (1999), Vallathol Award (2002), Basheer Award (2005), Guptan Nair Memorial Award (2007), Vayalar Ramavarma Award (2007) for Appuvinte Anweshanam, and FACT MKK Nayar Award (2009). Leelavathy is also a recipient of Padma Shri Award for her contribution to the Malayalam literature and education. She won Ezhuthachan Puraskaram, the highest literary prize in Kerala, in 2010, for her outstanding critical works. She was also conferred with many other literary awards including the Mathrubhumi Literary Award (2011), P. S. John Award (2011), K. P. Kesava Menon Award (2014), and O. N. V. Literary Award (2020).. In 2021, she was also awarded with the prestigious Kendra Sahitya Academy Fellowship.,

List of awards

References

External links

Spiritualism, materialism fuse in Balamaniyamma's poems
Leelavathi expresses concern at campus violence

Living people
1927 births
Malayalam-language writers
Writers from Kerala
Malayalam literary critics
Recipients of the Sahitya Akademi Award in Malayalam
Recipients of the Ezhuthachan Award
Recipients of the Kerala Sahitya Akademi Award
Recipients of the Padma Shri in literature & education
Academic staff of Government Victoria College, Palakkad
Maharaja's College, Ernakulam alumni
Academic staff of Maharaja's College, Ernakulam
20th-century Indian women writers
20th-century Indian writers
21st-century Indian women writers
21st-century Indian writers
People from Thrissur district
20th-century Indian women scientists
21st-century Indian women scientists
Indian women educational theorists
20th-century Indian educational theorists
Women writers from Kerala
21st-century Indian educational theorists
Women educators from Kerala
Educators from Kerala
20th-century women educators
21st-century women educators
Recipients of the Sahitya Akademi Prize for Translation
Recipients of the Abu Dhabi Sakthi Award